G4S Secure Solutions (USA) is an American / British-based security services company, and a subsidiary of G4S plc.  It was founded as The Wackenhut Corporation in 1954, in Coral Gables, Florida, by George Wackenhut and three partners (all are former FBI agents). In 2002, the company was acquired for $570 million by Danish corporation Group 4 Falck (itself then merged to form British company G4S in 2004). In 2010, G4S Wackenhut changed its name to G4S Secure Solutions (USA) to reflect the new business model. The G4S Americas Region headquarters is in Jupiter, Florida.

Background
In 1966, George Wackenhut took his company public.

In the mid-1960s, Florida Governor Claude Kirk commissioned the Wackenhut Corporation to help fight a "war on organized crime", awarding the company a $500,000 contract.  The commission lasted about a year but led to more than 80 criminal indictments, including many for local politicians and government employees. Following the murder of a British tourist at a rest stop in 1993, Florida contracted with Wackenhut to provide security at all state rest stops.

Security services
G4S provides security to specific government and corporate sectors: energy, utilities, and chemical/petrochemical, financial institutions, hospitals and healthcare facilities, major corporations and the construction industry, ports and airports, residential communities, retail and commercial real estate and transit systems.

Clients included GlaxoSmithKline and U.S. Customs and Border Protection.

Nuclear services at Peach Bottom (2008)
The Wackenhut Corporation provided armed security services for many nuclear power plants. In September 2007, its employees Kerry Beal and Paul A. Kennedy videotaped their fellow security guards at the Peach Bottom Nuclear Generating Station sleeping while on duty. Beal had previously tried to notify supervisors at Wackenhut and the US Nuclear Regulatory Commission about the breaches of security. Wackenhut's contract was terminated, ending its role guarding Peach Bottom and nine other nuclear plants.

Wackenhut Corrections Corporation (WCC)
In 2003, the management of WCC, the wholly owned subsidiary of Wackenhut's prison business, raised funds to repurchase all common stock held by G4S since 2002, changing its name to The GEO Group, Inc. The GEO Group, Inc. now operates former Wackenhut facilities in 14 states, as well as in South Africa and Australia.  Some facilities, such as the Wackenhut Corrections Centers in New York, retain the Wackenhut name despite no longer having any actual connection with the company.

Wackenhut and Miami-Dade
A dispute between the Wackenhut corporation and Miami-Dade Transit arose from allegations made by a former employee. Michelle Trimble claimed that G4S Wackenhut over-billed Miami-Dade County for work that had not been performed. As a result of the allegations of that lawsuit, the County ordered an audit of the contract in 2005. That audit was completed in 2009 and came up with an amount of estimated overbillings. In response, G4S Wackenhut filed a lawsuit in federal court alleging, among other things, that the audit's findings were erroneous.

In February 2010, the issue was resolved, and Miami-Dade County commissioners approved a $7.5 million settlement agreement with Wackenhut to resolve the dispute. The settlement deal had $3 million going to the county, $1.25 million for whistle-blower Trimble, whose lawsuit led the county to launch its own audit, and $3.25 million going to Trimble's attorneys. As part of the deal, Wackenhut was allowed to bid on future contracts and the county agreed not to use this case against it when considering Wackenhut's bids.

Anti-nuclear protests
Fingers were pointed at Wackenhut when it was revealed that anti-nuclear protesters, including an 82-year-old nun, had managed to cut through fences of one of the United States’ most protected nuclear facilities at Oak Ridge in Tennessee in July 2012. Three activists broke into the US Government's only weapons grade storage facility to paint graffiti and throw what they claimed was human blood on the walls. The breach and lack of security at the site at the time was blamed upon the absence of key Wackenhut personnel in the previous few weeks; the plant manager and chief operating officer had retired 12 days prior to the incident.

Omar Mateen

On June 12, 2016, Omar Mateen, who worked at G4S from 2007 until his death, committed one of the largest mass shootings in United States history. Though Mateen's employment as an armed guard only slightly facilitated his access to firearms, and the firearms refresher courses he took each four years at G4S suggested more substantial training on his own, the company's inability to detect prior warning signals brought it under widespread scrutiny.

Screening issues 
Under Florida state law, for him to work as an armed guard the company was required either to make a full psychiatric evaluation of Mateen, or to administer a "validated written psychological test".  The test administered was the updated Minnesota Multiphasic Personality Inventory (MMPI-2), a test used for job screenings and court cases requiring those subjected to it to agree or disagree with statements such as "My soul sometimes leaves my body" and "Once in a while I think of things too bad to talk about."  Carol Nudelman, the psychologist listed on the character certification submitted by G4S to the state said she stopped working for the company in 2005 and denies ever having met him. G4S said Mateen was not interviewed by a psychologist, but rather, a psychologist evaluated the results of a standard test used in job screenings, and his test was evaluated by the firm that bought Nudelman's practice: Headquarters for Psychological Evaluation, owned by Dr Joanne Bauling. G4S said this was a "clerical error." On September 10, 2016, the Florida Department of Agriculture and Consumer Services fined G4S $151,400 for providing inaccurate psychological testing information after it found the psychologist whose opinion was necessary to permit Mateen to carry a weapon was not practicing as a screener. Between 2006 and 2016, 1,514 forms were submitted erroneously listing Nudelman's name. Mateen's form was among those investigated.

The company was unaware of Mateen's sealed and expunged juvenile arrest record for misdemeanor battery. Although they verified his employment they took Mateen at his word that he was fired as a Florida corrections trainee for failing to report due to a fever.  He was actually dismissed for skipping classes, falling asleep in class, and asking two days after the Virginia Tech shooting if a classmate would tell if he brought a gun to class. Also during his time as a trainee, a fellow trainee said he threatened to kill everyone at a barbecue after his hamburger touched a piece of pork, and he was escorted from the property.

In 2010, Mateen was videotaped while working security for G4S at a site related to the BP oil spill.  His cynical description of the work situation was included in the 2012 documentary, The Big Fix.

Working with Mateen at the St. Lucie County Courthouse in 2013, a co-worker said he had complained to superiors at G4S about Mateen's frequent violent, racist and homophobic tirades, but that the company ignored him.  G4S denied having a record of those complaints.  After Mateen claimed to his co-workers a family connection to Al Qaeda and said he was a member of Hezbollah, the county sheriff's office called in the Federal Bureau of Investigation.  The St Lucie Sheriff's office "demanded" Mateen no longer provide security for the Courthouse.  When G4S became aware the FBI was investigating Mateen, they did not dismiss Mateen but transferred him to the south guardhouse of the PGA Village, a gated community in Palm Beach County.

Contract reviews 
Judges at two Treasure Coast courthouses that had been guarded by Mateen requested that G4S be replaced by sheriff's deputies.  At $377,000 and $86,000 respectively, the G4S contracts for St. Lucie and Indian River were cheaper by margins of $200,000 and $60,000 than the deputies.

The PGA Village board voted unanimously to review a $1 million annual contract with G4S and consider other vendors after the sale of a resident's home was cancelled by a purchaser who learned that Mateen had patrolled the community.

On June 22, Massachusetts Senator Kathleen O'Connor Ives called it "crazy and beyond ironic" in light of Mateen and other scandals to replace members of the Massachusetts Bay Transit Authority police union with G4S to guard the transit agency's money room.  The $400,000 contract with G4S was just more than half the cost of MBTA Transit Police, who had been replaced June 6 after security lapses were reported by outside experts.

See also

 Private security company

References

Further reading
 G4S Wackenhut rebrands as G4S 
 Minahan, John. The Quiet American: A Biography of George R. Wackenhut. International Publishing Group (September 1994) 
 Palast, Greg (2002). The Best Democracy Money Can Buy: The Truth About Corporate Cons, Globalization and High-Finance Fraudsters. Pluto Press. .
 Obituary of George Wackenhut from the Washington Post
 Wackenhut security officer dies 'heroically' at Holocaust Museum
 U.S. Mission acknowledges the heroic actions of G4S Wackenhut personnel in Pakistan

External links
 Parent official website

G4S
Business services companies established in 1954
Companies based in Palm Beach County, Florida
American companies established in 1954
1954 establishments in Florida
2002 mergers and acquisitions
American subsidiaries of foreign companies